Marc Sluszny (born in Antwerp, February 1, 1962 – June 28, 2018) was an adventurer, sportsman, keynote speaker, mental coach and author. Through extreme sports he searched to overcome his mental and physical boundaries. He broke several records and participated many times in the European and World Championships in different disciplines. During the last few years, Marc focused on coaching executive teams and high-level athletes.

Biography 
In 1982 Marc Sluszny played tennis for the Belgian National Davis Cup Team.
In 1988 he swam solo across the English Channel from Dover to Cap Blanc-Nez(10 hours 30 min).
In 1994 he broke the world record bungee jumping (6720 m) from a hot air balloon. In 1995 he became Belgium sky surfing champion and finished 4th at the World Championships in Eloy, Arizona. As a member of the Belgian Himalaya expedition he climbed, in 1997, the Annapurna (8031 m) without oxygen.
In 2000 he broke the Belgian hang gliding record aerobatics. In 2002 he was a member of the Belgian Olympic Fencing Team and finished 8th at the World Championships and 12th at the European Championships per team. As first Belgian ever he participated in the Rolex Sydney-Hobart yacht race.
In 2005 he finished several 24-hour auto races, among others Daytona and Nürburgring. In 2006 he flew across the United States from coast to coast with an old-timer seaplane (Lake Buccaneer). In 2007, he broke the altitude record (11,300 m) in a glider above the Andes. In 2008 he was team leader of the first Belgian diving expedition to the wreck of the HMHS Britannic (-120 m). In 2009 he finished 4th at the World Championships Powerboat racing.
In 2011 he was the pilot and captain of the national Belgian bobsleigh team (two- and four-man) and participated in both the World and European Championships. Furthermore, in 2011 the movie Sharkwise was released in the Belgian theaters, a documentary about his diving adventure outside of the cage with the great white shark. In June 2012 he ran down the Belgacom building in Brussels, setting a new world record (15'56) in the vertical run discipline. And in 2013 Marc dived to a depth of 168 meters (on open circuit) in the Blue hole in Dahab (Egypt). During the month of July 2016, Marc was part of a US diving expedition to the sunken liner ship, the SS Andrea Doria (its 60th anniversary).

Bibliography 
 2006: A rush of blood to the head
 2007: Cleared for the option 
 2008: 40,000 ft above the Andes
 2009: De negen levens van Marc Sluszny (Dutch)
 2011: SHARKWISE (Sluszny)
 2013: Fear Less
 2016: Pushing The Limits
 2017: Gedreven (Dutch)

Thrillers 
 2004: Code zwart (Van Loock & Sluszny) (Dutch)
 2005: De witte salamander (Van Loock & Sluszny)(Dutch)
 2006: En garde (Van Loock & Sluszny)(Dutch)
 2007: De bende (Van Loock & Sluszny)¨(Dutch)
 2009: Amulet (Van Loock & Sluszny)(Dutch)
 2011: Het mysterie van de Britannic (Van Loock & Sluszny)(Dutch)

Movie 
 2011: SHARKWISE this docu-film tells the compelling story of Marc Sluszny's quest to discover the true face of the ocean's most feared predator, the Great White Shark. The movie is narrated by Martin Sheen and directed by Lieven Debrauwer

Awards 
 2004 - Hercule Poirot award, nominated for Code zwart
 2005 - Diamanten Kogel award, nominated for De witte salamander
 2011 - Van Gogh award, winner with SHARKWISE
 2011 - Cannes Independent Film Festival, official selection with SHARKWISE

Articles 
 16/02/2008  De Standaard  Ik ga in alles voor mijn eigen top
 26/08/2008  DE MORGEN  Belgisch team duikt naar Britannic
 31/08/2008  Het Nieuwsblad  Ik probeer altijd de top te bereiken. Mijn top
 04/09/2008  DE MORGEN  Belg duikt naar de Britannic
 11/09/2008  DE MORGEN  Belgische expeditie onthult mysterie van gezonken Britannic
 12/09/2008  LA DERNIÈRE HEURE  Le Mystère du Britannic HMHS  JEAN BERNARD
 19/09/2008  LA DERNIÈRE HEURE  Plongée en au profonde pour une expedition belge
 19/11/2008  GAZET VAN ANTWERPEN  Ooit wil ik tussen witte haaien zwemmen  MARC DE SWERT
 18/12/2008  Het Nieuwsblad  Zwemmen met Jaws
 20/12/2008  GAZET VAN ANTWERPEN  Elke fout kan fataal zijn  MARC DE SWERT
 08/01/2009  Het Nieuwsblad  Stoeien met Jaws
 25/01/2009  Het Nieuwsblad  Antwerps avonturier zwemt tussen de tijgerhaaien
 25/01/2009  LA DERNIÈRE HEURE  Nos amis les requins blancs  JEAN BERNARD
 10/02/2009  De Nieuwe Gazet  Antwerpenaars filmen tussen haaien  FRANK JAGERS
 10/02/2009  Het nieuwsblad  Even de haaien aaien  DIETER STYNEN
 25/02/2009  GAZET VAN ANTWERPEN  Antwerps avonturier Marc Sluszny redt motorrijder uit vuurzee  MARC DE SWERT
 25/02/2009  Het Laatste Nieuws  Vlaming redt motard uit bosbrand
 02/05/2009  Het Nieuwsblad  Angst en adrenaline
 15/05/2009  GAZET VAN ANTWERPEN  Antwerps team derde in eerste race
 20/07/2009  Het Nieuwsblad  Zwemmen tussen de witte killers
 11/09/2009  GAZET VAN ANTWERPEN  Hopen op slecht weer, veel wind en ruwe zee
 18/09/2009  GAZET VAN ANTWERPEN  Het mocht niet zijn
 18/04/2010  LA DERNIÈRE HEURE  Sluszny sur les traces de Houben  JEAN BERNARD
 07/05/2010  Investors Times  Europe's most extreme character falls in love with extreme product
 10/06/2010  Het Nieuwsblad  Ik ben altijd bang  JO DE RUYCK
 17/07/2010  LA DERNIÈRE HEURE  L'aventure est son métier
 11/12/2010  Het Laatste Nieuws  Ik was gek genoeg  KJELL DOMS
 13/12/2010  Het Laatste Nieuws  Sluszny ook met viermansbob naar EK en WK
 17/12/2010  GAZET VAN ANTWERPEN  De indrukwekkendste sport die ik ooit deed  PATRICK VAN DYCK
 28/12/2010  Algemeen Dagblad Sportwereld  De man die alles kan en alles durft  JEROEN SCHMALE
 13/01/2011  Le SOIR  Sluszny:<< Il faut être un peu barjo pour ce sport!>>  JOËL GRÉGOIRE
 21/01/2011  Het Laatste Nieuws  Ik ben mijn eigen held  BART FIEREMANS
 22/01/2011  Het Laatste Nieuws  Ik rust wel als ik dood ben  HANS JACOBS
 24/01/2011  Het laatste Nieuws  Sluszny stuurt viermansbob naar 16de plek op EK
 03/02/2011  Dagblad De Pers  Een mooier cv dan Indiana Jones en 007  THIJS ZONNEVELD
 19/02/2011  GAZET VAN ANTWERPEN  Concurrentie heeft lichtjaren voorsprong
 18/03/2011  Het Laatste Nieuws  Marc Sluszny 'live' tussen de haaien
 19/03/2011  HET BELANG VAN LIMBURG  Vrachtwagen met witte tanden
 31/03/2011  GAZET VAN ANTWERPEN  MARC SLUSZNY "Ik ben bang voor het onbekende"  WIM DAENINCK
 19/10/2011  GAZET VAN ANTWERPEN  Antwerpenaar duikt naar wrak zusterschip Titanic  DENNIS VAN DAMME

References 

 https://web.archive.org/web/20110204175219/http://www.depers.nl/sport/542619/Een-mooier-cv-dan-Indiana-Jones-en-007.html
 https://www.faz.net/aktuell/sport/mehr-sport/marc-sluszny-im-gespraech-ich-bin-nicht-als-james-bond-geboren-1595192.html
 https://web.archive.org/web/20120426041628/http://www.togethermag.eu/articles/marc-sluszny-it%E2%80%99s-how-good-you-want-be
 http://www.nieuwsblad.be/article/detail.aspx?articleid=GREF1KK8
 https://web.archive.org/web/20120426041627/http://fr.clint.be/entertainment/people/marc-sluszny-enfin-un-belge-aux-multiples-records-gallery
 http://www.skynet.be/generation-nl/film/dossier/839516/the-name-sluszny-marc-sluszny
 http://www.focus.de/sport/mehrsport/bob-extrem-typ-sluszny-haie-basejumping-und-nun-bob_aid_602044.html
 http://www.lavenir.net/article/detail.aspx?articleid=B42367077110123
 http://weekend.levif.be/tendance/lifestyle/people/marc-sluszny-risque-zorro/article-1195041970568.htm
 https://web.archive.org/web/20120522192529/http://sportmagazine.knack.be/sport/belga-sport/marc-sluszny-16e-in-viermansbob-op-ek-bobslee/article-1194930102383.htm
 http://www.skynet.be/generation-nl/dossier/839516/the-name-sluszny-marc-sluszny
 http://www.sterrennieuws.be/nieuws/de-nieuwe-belgische-giant-marc-sluszny-volgt-sergio-herman-op/
 https://web.archive.org/web/20120628225758/http://www.sporza.be/cm/sporza/videozone/MG_EK_voetbal_2012/MG_EK_opvallend/1.1345704
 https://www.youtube.com/watch?v=75X7Zf46pBw
 https://web.archive.org/web/20180705062641/http://framework.latimes.com/2012/06/26/pictures-in-the-news-455/#/4
 http://video.adelaidenow.com.au/2251047295/Stuntman-gets-world-record-vertical-run
 http://www.itv.com/news/2012-06-28/daredevil-completes-102-metre-vertical-run/
 http://tv.ibtimes.com/stuntman-breaks-world-record-vertical-run/6401.html
 http://www.worldrecordsacademy.org/sports/fastest_vertical_run_Mark_Sluszny_sets_world_record_112946.html

Link 
 Officiële website
 Executive Coaching
 Marc Sluszny Books

Sportspeople from Antwerp
Belgian non-fiction writers
Belgian male writers
1962 births
2018 deaths
Male non-fiction writers